Love in Waiting is a 1948 British comedy film directed by Douglas Peirce, and starring David Tomlinson. It was made at Highbury Studios as a second feature for release by the Rank Organisation.

Plot
In a busy restaurant during the food rationing period in the wake of Second World War, three waitresses fall in love with the manager (Tomlinson), the garbage man (who is the owner's grandson in disguise), and the downstairs neighbour - while trying to stay in the good books of the ruthless Miss Bell, who runs the catering staff and is selling restaurant food supplies to the Black Market.

Cast
 David Tomlinson as Robert Clitheroe
 Andrew Crawford as Dick Lambert
 Peggy Evans as Gloria 'Golly' Raine
 Elspet Gray as  Brenda Lawrence
 Patsy Drake as  Mary Corder
 George Merritt as  James Hartley Pepperfield
 Eliot Makeham as  Sam Baxter
 John Witty as  Harry Pepperfield
 Linda Gray as Miss Bell

Critical reception
TV Guide called it an "uninteresting farce"; while the only positive The British 'B' Film was able to conclude, was that "at least the hour long Love in Waiting has brevity on its side."

References

External links
 

1948 films
British comedy films
1948 comedy films
Films set in London
Films shot at Highbury Studios
British black-and-white films
1949 comedy films
1949 films
1940s English-language films
1940s British films